The Russell Jail is a historic town holding facility in Russell, Arkansas.  It is located near the town post office, in a field at the junction of West Elm Street and Highway Avenue (Arkansas Highway 367).  It is a small single-story concrete structure, with a slightly bowed roof, a doorway opening (now lacking its metal door) on one wall, and small square barred openings on the sides.  It was built about 1935 with funding support from the Works Progress Administration, and is one just three such structures in White County.

The building was listed on the National Register of Historic Places in 1992.

See also
 Beebe Jail
 McRae Jail
 National Register of Historic Places listings in White County, Arkansas

References

Jails on the National Register of Historic Places in Arkansas
National Register of Historic Places in White County, Arkansas
Works Progress Administration in Arkansas
1935 establishments in Arkansas
Government buildings completed in 1935